Ali Yachkaschi (in Persian علی یخکشی - alternative spellings: Ali Yakhkeshi) (1939 in Behshahr, Iran) is an Iranian professor of Environmental science, environmental activist and author. Following his high school diploma, he left Iran to continue his higher education at the University of Göttingen in Germany. He achieved a B.Sc, M.Sc as well as a PhD degree in management and policy of natural resources from the University of Göttingen. He is known as the “Father of Environmental Sciences in Iran”, due to his outstanding efforts and achievements to publicize the awareness to environmental protection in the country, including the foundation of environmental sciences as an independent field of study in 1974 at the University of Tehran, Iran.
During his career in universities of Tehran and Mazandaran, he initiated numerous exchange programs for students and academic staff of Iranian and German faculties of forest and environmental sciences, thereby contributing to strengthen the mutual cultural and scientific understanding between scientific centers of both countries.

Biography
Ali Yachkaschi was born in Yachkasch village, a mountainous village located within the forested areas in south of Behshahr, Mazandaran province in northern Iran. He accomplished his primary, secondary as well as high school in Behshahr, before he left to Germany to carry on his higher education at the Georg-August University of Göttingen. Upon his return to Iran in 1967, he contributed to found the environmental sciences as an independent field of study within the faculty of natural resources of the University of Tehran. He was awarded numerous prizes and was acknowledged several times for his efforts in terms of education and research in environmental sciences. Examples can be referred such as being appreciated as the outstanding university professor in Iran (2000), the veteran professor of the University of Mazandaran (2001), National Environmental Prize (2002), and the golden statue of the Iranian association of environmentalists (2004). He also initiated one of the earliest attempts towards the idea of Dialogue Among Civilizations within the German academic landscape.

Experiences and honors
 Habilitation in policy and management of natural resources at the Georg-August-University of Göttingen, Germany (1974)
 Academic member at the University of Tehran, Iran (1968-1980)
 Academic member at the Georg-August-University of Göttingen, Germany (1980-2000)
 Research spokesman of the Georg-August-University of Göttingen, Germany (...)
 Representative of Asian-African countries and member of the directory board of the International Union of Forest Research Organizations (IUFRO)
 Member of the directory board of the global society of Asian-African researchers
 Foundation of the cultural German-Iranian Cultural Foundation
 Academic member at the University of Mazandaran, Iran (2000-2010)
 Consultant of the research and education deputy of the National Department of Environment, Iran (2003 so far) 
 Winner of the National Environmental Prize of Iran 2003
 Winner of the golden statue of environmental research of Iran 2005
 Selected outstanding professor of Iran 2001
 Awarded as being amongst the 30 greatest Iranian environmentalists 2009
 Management and coordination of over 10 national and international research projects
 Authorship of 22 text books in environmental policy and management in Persian & German
 More than 90 peer reviewed research papers in German, English, French, Turkish and Persian
 Initiative for the plantation of over 60 ha of forests in Iran
 Contribution to the FAO global forest tenure reform
 Contribution in mapping the Lake Urmia national park 1977
 Supervision of more than 100 Students on their Master- and PhD- thesis at the University of Goettingen (Germany), University of Mazandaran, University of Tehran, Tarbiat Modares University, Gorgan University in Iran and some universities in  Armenia.

References

External links

1939 births
Iranian environmentalists
University of Göttingen alumni
Academic staff of the University of Tehran
Academic staff of the University of Mazandaran
Living people
People from Behshahr